Raumati is a New Zealand place name and may refer to:

Raumati Beach, Kapiti Coast, New Zealand
Raumati South, Kapiti Coast, New Zealand
Raumati Hearts, a former name of Kapiti Coast United, a New Zealand association football club
Raumati railway station, a proposed station on the Kapiti Line
, a locality